Zambia have competed in fourteen Commonwealth Games, though the first appearance was in 1954 as Northern Rhodesia. Northern Rhodesia competed as part of Rhodesia and Nyasaland in 1962.

The country competed for the first time as Zambia in the 1970 British Commonwealth Games, and has participated in every Games since except for the 1986 Games. 

Zambia has won 39 Commonwealth Games medals, including nine medals won in the 1954 and 1958 Games as Northern Rhodesia.

Medals

Notes
  Their participation was as Northern Rhodesia.

References

External links
National Olympic Committee of Zambia

 
Nations at the Commonwealth Games